Louis Carr (born 28 January 1960) is a former speedway rider from England.

Speedway career 
Carr reached the final of the British Speedway Championship in 1986. He rode in the top tier of British Speedway from 1976–1995, riding for various clubs.

Family
His brother Peter Carr was also a speedway rider.

References 

1960 births
Living people
British speedway riders
Belle Vue Aces riders
Birmingham Brummies riders
Coventry Bees riders
Cradley Heathens riders
Ellesmere Port Gunners riders
Exeter Falcons riders
Hull Vikings riders
Ipswich Witches riders
Poole Pirates riders
Sheffield Tigers riders
Stoke Potters riders
Swindon Robins riders
Wolverhampton Wolves riders